Jollydora glandulosa is a species of plant in the Connaraceae family. It is found in Cameroon and Nigeria.

References

Connaraceae
Vulnerable plants
Taxonomy articles created by Polbot